The Bowraville murders is the name given to three deaths that occurred over five months from September 1990 to February 1991 in Bowraville, New South Wales, Australia. All three victims were Aboriginal, and all disappeared after parties in Bowraville's Aboriginal community, in an area known as The Mission. A local labourer, who was regarded by police as the prime suspect, was charged with two of the murders but was acquitted following trials in 1994 and 2006. On 13 September 2018, the New South Wales Court of Criminal Appeal decided that the man could not be retried for the murders. On 22 March 2019, the High Court of Australia refused an application by the Attorney General of New South Wales to bring an appeal against that decision.

Victims
The first victim, 16-year-old Colleen Walker of Sawtell, New South Wales, was in the rural timber town of Bowraville visiting relatives. She was last seen alive on 13 September 1990, walking away from a party in the Aboriginal community of The Mission. The following day, Walker's family reported to the police that she was missing. Despite the family believing something terrible had happened, the missing person's report was not taken seriously by local police; no search parties were formed and no formal action was taken. Walker's body has not been found, although articles of her clothing were later found weighed down by rocks in the Nambucca River.

On 4 October 1990, Walker's cousin, four-year-old Evelyn Greenup, disappeared after a party at her grandmother's house. She was last seen by her mother as she was put to bed sometime during the night, but was gone by next morning. Greenup's grandmother later recalled hearing her cry out in the night but did not think much of it at the time. On 27 April 1991, Greenup's skeletal remains were found in bushland near Congarinni Road. An autopsy could not conclusively determine the cause of death, but noted that a skull injury was "consistent with a forceful penetration by a sharp instrument".

On 31 January 1991, 16-year-old Clinton Speedy-Duroux went missing after a party at The Mission. He was last known to have stayed with his girlfriend in a yellow Viscount caravan used by the suspect on the morning of 1 February. On 18 February, Speedy-Duroux's remains were discovered in bushland near Congarinni Road about seven kilometres outside Bowraville. A pillowcase from the caravan was located underneath his clothing.

Investigation
Several similarities between the disappearances that led police to believe that they were committed by the same killer:
 All took place within the short time frame of five months.
 All three victims were Aboriginal.
 Autopsies of the two bodies that were found, indicate both suffered trauma to the head.
 All three victims disappeared after parties in the Aboriginal community in Bowraville, in an area known as The Mission.

Trials
On 8 April 1991, a 25-year-old local Bowraville labourer, Thomas Jay Heart, was arrested for the murder of Speedy-Duroux. He was well known in the Aboriginal community in Bowraville and often attended the parties at The Mission. On 16 October 1991, while out on bail awaiting trial, the man was arrested and charged with the murder of Greenup. Facing a circumstantial case, he was acquitted of Speedy-Duroux's murder by an NSW Supreme Court jury on 18 February 1994, the third anniversary of the discovery of Speedy-Duroux's body. After the acquittal, prosecutors did not proceed with the trial against him for the murder of Greenup.

In 1997, the New South Wales Police Commissioner Peter Ryan set up Task Force Ancud to continue the investigation into the unsolved murders. On 9 February 2004, the NSW Coroner John Abernethy reopened the inquests into Greenup's death and the suspected death of Walker. On 10 September 2004, he recommended the man be charged afresh with Greenup's murder. As a result, he was charged again, this time for the murder of Greenup. The trial was conducted in February 2006. The prosecution produced two supposed confessions made by him, but he was acquitted on 3 March 2006.

Aftermath
The murders, and the fact that no one has been convicted of the crimes, is a source of pain and bitterness in the Aboriginal community in Bowraville. After the acquittal in 2006, the NSW Police Minister raised the reward to $250,000 for information leading to the conviction of the persons responsible for the murders. The previous reward was $100,000, and it was only for information related to the disappearance of Walker. In 2006, changes were made to double jeopardy legislation in NSW opening the way for retrial of any person acquitted of a life-sentence offence if "fresh and compelling evidence" was uncovered. In October 2011, Walker's family found bones in bushland near Macksville, New South Wales, but forensic testing indicated that they were animal remains.

Application for a retrial
In 2016, the detective inspector leading the investigation made a submission to the NSW Attorney General calling for a retrial based on new evidence. In the same month, the suspect said that he was not necessarily opposed to a retrial. In May there was a protest march by the families of the victims and their supporters calling for legislative change to the NSW Parliament building.

On 9 February 2017, police laid a murder charge against the suspect, and the NSW Attorney General applied to the Court of Criminal Appeal for a retrial. The Attorney General's application was heard by the Court of Criminal Appeal beginning on 29 November 2017. The Attorney General needed to identify "fresh and compelling" evidence in order to have the man's acquittals quashed and to obtain an order for a retrial. On 13 September 2018, the court dismissed the application, concluding that none of the evidence was "fresh and compelling" and that he therefore could not be retried for the murders. The court concluded that most of the evidence relied upon was not "fresh", because it was available to be tendered or brought forward prior to the earlier trial of the man for the murder of Greenup.

On 22 March 2019, the High Court of Australia refused an application by the Attorney General for special leave to appeal against the decision of the Court of Criminal Appeal, concluding that there was no reason to doubt the correctness of that decision. The campaign for a retrial continues.

Media
In 2013, the families of the victims worked with Eualeyai/Kamillaroi filmmaker Larissa Behrendt on Innocence Betrayed, a documentary film detailing the experience of the Aboriginal families and communities pursuing justice. The film was shortlisted for both a Walkley Award and an Australian Human Rights Award in 2014 and won a UTS Human Right Award.

Dan Box, a crime reporter with The Australian, hosted a 5-part Australian crime podcast that detailed the murders, released in May 2016, called Bowraville. Box also released a book of the same name in July 2019.

See also
 List of fugitives from justice who disappeared
 List of unsolved murders
 Lois Roberts

References

External links
'The Mission: The Bowraville Murders', by Malcolm Knox, 2011

1990 murders in Australia
1991 murders in Australia
1990s in New South Wales
1990s missing person cases
Formerly missing people
Fugitives wanted by Australia
Missing person cases in Australia
Murder in New South Wales
Serial murders in Australia
Unidentified serial killers
Unsolved murders in Australia